The Tallahassee Open was a golf tournament on the Nike Tour. It ran from 1995 to 1996.

It was played at the Golden Eagle Country Club in Tallahassee, Florida, and in 1996 the winner earned $36,000.

Winners

Former Korn Ferry Tour events
Golf in Florida
Sports in Tallahassee, Florida
Recurring sporting events established in 1995
Recurring sporting events disestablished in 1996